NA-132 Kasur-II is a constituency for the National Assembly of Pakistan.

Members of Parliament

2018-2022: NA-138 Kasur-II

Election 2002 

General elections were held on 10 Oct 2002. Chaudhry Manzoor Ahmad of PPP won by 28,732 votes.

Election 2008 

General elections were held on 18 Feb 2008. Wasim Akhtar Sheikh of PML-N won by 51,436 votes.

Election 2013 

General elections were held on 11 May 2013. Waseem Akhtar Shaikh of PML-N won by 102,565 votes and became the  member of National Assembly.

Election 2018 

General elections were held on 25 July 2018.

See also
NA-131 Kasur-I
NA-133 Kasur-III

References

External links 
 Election result's official website

NA-139
Kasur